McGraw-Hill Education is an educational publisher and digital learning company.

McGraw-Hill may also refer to:

 S&P Global, an American financial corporation formerly known as McGraw-Hill
 McGraw-Hill Telescope at MDM Observatory, American astronomical observatory
 4432 McGraw-Hill, an asteroid named in honor of the telescope

See also
 McGraw-Hill Building (disambiguation)
 Tim McGraw and Faith Hill, a celebrity couple